Bembidion perspicuum is a species of ground beetle in the family Carabidae. It is found in North America.

References

Further reading
 

perspicuum
Beetles described in 1848